Monacha cartusiana is a species of small air-breathing land snail, a terrestrial pulmonate gastropod mollusk in the family Hygromiidae, the hairy snails and their allies.

This is the type species of the genus Monacha.

Distribution 

The native distribution of this species is Atlantic-Mediterranean. It lives in various areas including:
 Great Britain. This species was fully protected in the United Kingdom under the Wildlife and Countryside Act 1981 from 1981 to 1988.
 Ukraine

This species has been accidentally introduced and naturalized in:
 United States - Newcastle County, Delaware

Life cycle 
The size of the egg is 1.8 mm.

References

 Provoost, S.; Bonte, D. (Ed.) (2004). Animated dunes: a view of biodiversity at the Flemish coast [Levende duinen: een overzicht van de biodiversiteit aan de Vlaamse kust]. Mededelingen van het Instituut voor Natuurbehoud, 22. Instituut voor Natuurbehoud: Brussel, Belgium. ISBN 90-403-0205-7. 416, ill., appendices pp.
 Sysoev, A. V. & Schileyko, A. A. (2009). Land snails and slugs of Russia and adjacent countries. Sofia/Moskva (Pensoft). 312 pp., 142 plates.
 Holyoak, D. T. & Holyoak, G. A. (2018). A new genus Zenobiellina for Helix subrufescens Miller, 1822 (Hygromiidae), with description of a new congeneric species from northern Spain. Iberus. 36 (2): 133-147

External links
 Müller, O. F. (1774). Vermium terrestrium et fluviatilium, seu animalium infusorium, Helminthicorum, et testaceorum, non marinorum, succincta historia. vol 2: I-XXXVI, 1-214, 10 unnumbered pages. Havniae et Lipsiae, apud Heineck et Faber, ex officina Molleriana
  Gray, J. E. (1821). A natural arrangement of Mollusca, according to their internal structure. London Medical Repository. 15 (87): 229–239
 Caziot, E. (1909). Description d'espèces nouvelles de mollusques terrestres et fluviatiles du département des Alpes-Maritimes. Bulletin de la Société zoologique de France. 34: 87-95, 99-104.

Hygromiidae
Gastropods described in 1774
Taxa named by Otto Friedrich Müller